Lorenzo "Renzo" Squinobal (born 15 January 1951) from Gressoney-Saint-Jean is an Italian mountain climber, mountain guide  and ski mountaineer.

Together with his brothers Oreste and Arturo, he placed first in the mountain guides team category in the 1975 Trofeo Mezzalama edition, which was carried out as the first World Championship of Skimountaineering. Together with Arturo and Danilo Barell he also won the 1978 Trofeo Mezzalama in the same category.

References

1951 births
Living people
Italian mountain climbers
Italian male ski mountaineers
World ski mountaineering champions
People from Gressoney-Saint-Jean
Alpine guides
Sportspeople from Aosta Valley